The given name or nickname AJ may refer to:

In arts and media
AJ Akuoko-Sarpong, Ghanaian media personality
A. J. Alan (1883–1941), English magician, intelligence officer, short story writer, and radio broadcaster
AJ Alexander (born 1980), American model and Playboy Playmate
A. J. Antoon (1944–1992), American theatre director
A. J. Bakunas (1950–1978), American stuntman
A. J. Balaban (1889–1962), American showman
A. J. Beirens (1947–2020), Belgian radio producer and journalist
A. J. Benza, American gossip columnist and television host
A. J. Bermudez, American author and screenwriter
A. J. Bowen (born 1977), American actor and producer
AJ Bridel (born c. 1994), Canadian actress and singer
A. J. Brown (1897–1978), English theatre, film, and television actor
A. J. Buckley (born 1977), Irish-Canadian actor
A. J. Calloway (born 1974), American television personality
A. J. Carothers (1931–2007), American playwright and television writer
A. J. Casson (1898–1992), Canadian artist
AJ Castillo (born 1994), American singer, recording artist, accordionist, singer, performer, and producer
A. J. Cook (born 1978), Canadian actress
A. J. Croce (born 1971), American singer and songwriter
A. J. Cronin (1896–1981), Scottish physician and novelist
A. J. Dalton (born 1970), British fantasy writer and teacher
A. J. Daulerio (born c. 1974), American writer and blogger
A. J. W. Dawson, English singer-songwriter
AJ Dee, (born 1982), Filipino actor, model, and swimmer
A. J. Finn (born 1979), American editor and author
A. J. Gibson  (1862–1927), American architect
Lee Gi-kwang "AJ" (born 1990), South Korean entertainer
AJ Gil (born 1984), American singer, songwriter, and actor
AJ Glueckert, American opera singer
A. J. Gundell, American musician and music director
A. J. Hammer (born 1966), American television and radio personality
A. J. Hartley (born 1964), British-American novelist
A. J. Healy (born 1969), Irish author
A. J. Holmes (born 1988), American actor, singer, and composer
A. J. Jackson, American filmmaker, musician, songwriter, and record producer
A. J. Jacobs (born 1968), American journalist and author
Adrienne Janic (born 1974), American actress and television host
AJ Junior, real name Achraf Janussi, songwriter
A. J. Kardar (1926–2002), Pakistani film director, producer, and screenwriter
A. J. S. Lakshmi Shree (born 1996), Bangalore-Indian visual artist
AJ Lamas (born 1983), American actor
AJ Lambert (born 1974), American musician
A. J. Langer (born 1974), American actress
A. J. Langguth (1933–2014), American author, journalist, and educator
A. J. Liebling (1904–1963), American journalist
A. J. Locascio, American actor, director, and producer
A. J. Masters (1950–2015), American country singer
AJ McLean (born 1978), American singer and member of the band Backstreet Boys
A. J. Meek (born 1941), American photographer, teacher, and writer
AJ Michalka (born 1991), American actress and musician
A. J. Mills (1872–1919), English lyricist
AJ Mitchell (born 2001), American singer-songwriter
A. J. Mogis, American musician
AJ Muhlach (born 1992), Filipino actor, singer and member of the XLR8
AJ Nelson (born 1985), Ghanaian recording artist
AJ Odasso (born 1981), American author and poet
AJ Odudu Onatejiro "AJ" Odudu (born 1988) British television presenter
AJ Pearce (born 1964), English author
A. J. Pero (1959–2015), American drummer of the band Twisted Sister
AJ Perez (born 1981) Filipino blogger and motivational speaker
AJ Perez (1993–2011), Filipino actor
A. J. Potter (1918–1980), Irish composer and teacher
AJ Pritchard (born 1994), English dancer and choreographer
A. J. Quinnell, pen name for the English novelist, Philip Nicholson
AJ Rafael (born 1989), Filipino-American singer-songwriter
A.J. Rathbun, American author, mixologist, poet, and cooking instructor
A. J. Reynolds, Canadian performer, entertainer, and radio personality
A. J. Riebli (born 1969), American voice actor and executive
AJ Roach (born 1975), American singer-songwriter
A. J. Sass, American author
A.J. Saudin (born 1992), Canadian actor, singer, songwriter, and record producer
A. J. Schnack (born 1968), American filmmaker
A. J. Seymour (1914–1989), Guyanese poet, essayist, memoirist, and editor
AJ Smith, American songwriter and musician
A. J. Smith, British author
A. J. M. Smith (1902–1980), Canadian poet and anthologist
A. J. Thomas (born 1952), Indian poet, translator, and editor
AJ Tracey (born 1994), British rapper, singer, songwriter, and record producer
A. J. Trauth (born 1986), American actor and musician
A. J. Turner (1818–1905), American composer, band leader, and professor
A. J. Verdelle (born 1960), American novelist

In sports
A. J. Abrams (born 1986), American basketball player
A. J. Achter (born 1988), American baseball pitcher and college baseball coach
AJ Agazarm (born 1990), American Brazilian Jiu-Jitsu practitioner and mixed martial arts fighter
AJ Alatimu (born 1993), Samoan rugby union player
A. J. Alexy (born 1998), American baseball pitcher
A. J. Allmendinger (born 1981), American racing driver
AJ Andrews (born 1993), American softball player
A. J. Arcuri (born 1997), American football player
A. J. Banal (born 1988), Filipino boxer
A. J. Bear (born 1977), Australian alpine skier
A. J. Bouye (born 1991), American football player
A. J. Bramlett (born 1977), American basketball player
A. J. Brodeur (born 1996), American basketball player
A. J. Brown (born 1997), American football player
A. J. Burnett (born 1977), American baseball pitcher
A. J. Cann (born 1991), American football player
A. J. Christoff (born c. 1945), American college football coach
A. J. Cochran (born 1993), American soccer player
AJ Coertzen (born 1990), South African rugby union player
A. J. Cole (born 1992), American baseball pitcher
A. J. Cole III (born 1995), American football player
A. J. Cooper, American football player and coach
A. J. Corrado  (born 1992), American soccer player
A. J. Cruz (born 1991), American football player
A. J. Davis (born 1983), American football player
A. J. Davis (born 1989), American football player
A. J. Davis (born 1995), American basketball player
A. J. DeLaGarza (born 1987), American soccer player
A. J. Derby (born 1991), American football player
A. J. Dillon (born 1998), American football player
AJ Dixon (1886–1935), British racing driver
A. J. Duhe (born 1955), American football player
AJ Dungo, American surfer and illustrator
A. J. Edds (born 1987), American football player
Adam AJ Edelman (born 1991), American-born four-time Israeli National Champion in skeleton event, and Israeli Olympian
A. J. Edu (born 2000), Cypriot-Filipino basketball player
A. J. Ellis (born 1981), American baseball catcher and coach
A. J. English (born 1967), American basketball player
A. J. English (born 1992), American basketball player
A. J. Epenesa (born 1998), American football player
AJ Faigin (born 1947), American sports agent
A. J. Feeley (born 1977), American football player
A.J. Ferrari (born 2001), American wrestler
A. J. Fike (born 1980), American racing driver
A. J. Foyt (born 1935), American racing driver
A. J. Foyt IV (born 1984), American racing driver and football scout
A. J. Francis (born 1990), American wrestler, musician, and football player
AJ Francois (born 2003), American-Dominican footballer
A. J. Freeley, New Zealand wrestler
A. J. Gale (born 1987), Canadian ice hockey player
A. J. Gass (born 1975), Canadian football player
AJ George (born 1996), Antiguan footballer
A. J. Ghent (born 1986), American singer-songwriter, record producer, and guitarist
AJ Gilbert (born 1987), Australian rugby union player
AJ Ginnis (born 1994), Greek-American alpine ski racer
A. J. Godbolt (born 1984), American soccer player
A. J. Granger (born 1978), American basketball player
A. J. Graves (born 1985), American basketball player
A. J. Gray (born 1988), Canadian soccer player
AJ Greaves (born 2000), English footballer
A. J. Green (born 1988), American football player
A. J. Green (born 1998), American football player
A. J. Green (born 1999), American basketball player
A. J. Greer (born 1996), Canadian ice hockey player
A. J. Griffin (born 1988), American baseball pitcher
AJ Griffin (born 2003), American basketball player
A. J. Guyton (born 1978), American basketball player and coach
A. J. Haglund (born 1983), American football kicker
A. J. Hammons (born 1992), American basketball player
A. J. Harmon (born 1989), American football player
A. J. Harris (born 1984), American football player
A. J. Hawk (born 1984), American football player
A. J. Hendy (born 1993), American football player
A. J. Henning (born 2001), American football player
A. J. Henriksen (born 1979), American racing driver
A. J. Hinch (born 1974), American baseball player and coach
AJ Hurt (born 2000), American alpine ski racer
AJ Jacobs (born 1985), South African rugby referee
A. J. Jenkins (born 1989), American football player
AJ Jennings (born 1971), Australian Paralympic canoeist
A. J. Jiménez (born 1990), Puerto Rican baseball player
A. J. Johnson (born 1967), American football player
A. J. Johnson (born 1991), American football player
A. J. Johnson (born 1992), American bowler
A. J. Jones (born 1959), American football player
A. J. Kitt (born 1968), American alpine ski racer
A. J. Klein (born 1991), American football player
A. J. Ladwig (born 1992), American baseball pitcher
AJ Lam (born 1998), New Zealand rugby union player
A. J. Lawson (born 2000), Canadian basketball player
AJ Lee (born 1987), ring name for April Jeanette Mendez, an American professional wrestler
A. J. Lockhart (1898–1986), American baseball player
AJ MacGinty (born 1990), Irish rugby player
A. J. Mandani (born 1987), Filipino-Canadian basketball player
AJ Marcucci (born 1999), American soccer player
A.J. Matthews (born 1988), American mixed martial artist
A. J. McCarron (born 1990), American football player
A. J. McKee (born 1995), American mixed martial artist
A. J. Milwee (born 1986), American football player and coach
A. J. Minter (born 1993), American baseball pitcher
A. J. Mleczko (born 1975), American ice hockey player and analyst
A. J. Moore (born 1995), American football player
A. J. Morris (born 1986), American baseball pitcher
A. J. Moyer (born 1987), American racing river
A. J. Murray (born 1982), American baseball pitcher
A. J. Nicholson (born 1983), American football player
A. J. Ofodile (born 1973), American football player
A. J. Ouellette (born 1995), American football player
A. J. Pagano, American football player
A. J. Parker (born 1998), American football player
A. J. Paterson (born 1996), American soccer player'
A. J. Petrucci (born 1951), American wrestler
A. J. Pierzynski (born 1976), American baseball player
A. J. Pollock (born 1987), American baseball player
A. J. Preller (born 1977), American baseball general manager
A. J. Price (born 1986), American basketball player
A.J. Puckett (born 1995), American baseball pitcher
A. J. Puk (born 1995), American baseball pitcher
A. J. Raebel (born 1985), American football player
A. J. Ramos (born 1986), American baseball pitcher
A. J. Reed (born 1993), American baseball player
A. J. Reeves (born 1999), American basketball player
A. J. Richardson (born 1995), American football player
A. J. Rose (born 1997), American football player
AJ Rosen (born 1984), British-American luge Olympian
A. J. Sager (born 1965), American baseball player
A. J. Schable (born 1984), American football player
A. J. Schugel (born 1989), American baseball pitcher
AJ Seals (born 2000), American soccer player
A. J. Shannon (born 1980), Canadian lacrosse player
A. J. Shepherd (1926–2005), American racing driver
A. J. Simcox (born 1994), American baseball player
A. J. Slaughter (born 1987), American-Polish basketball player
A. J. Smith (born 1949), American football player, coach, scout, and executive
A. J. Soares (born 1988), American soccer player
A. J. Sturzenegger (1888–1949), American football and baseball player and coach
A.J. Styles (born 1977), ring name for Allen Jones, an American professional wrestler
A. J. Suggs (born 1980), American football player
AJ Swann, American football player
A. J. Tarpley (born 1992), American football player
A. J. Terrell (born 1998), American football player
A. J. Thelen (born 1986), American ice hockey player
A. J. Thomas (born 1999), American football player
A. J. Trapasso (born 1986), American football punter
A. J. Valenzuela (born 1998), American soccer player
AJ Venter (born 1973), South African rugby union player
A. J. Verel, American kickboxer, martial artist, actor, and stuntman
A. J. Wallace (born 1988), American football player
A. J. Walton (born 1990), American basketball player
A. J. Watson (1924–2014), American racing car builder and chief mechanic
A. J. Webbe (1855–1941), English cricketer
A. J. Whitaker (born 1992), American volleyball player
A. J. Wood (born 1973), American soccer player
A. J. Wynder (born 1964), American basketball player and coach

In other fields
A. J. Aitken (1921–1998), Scottish lexicographer and scholar
A. J. Mohammad Ali, Bangladeshi politician
A. J. Whitacre Allen (1857–1939), British Army officer
A.J. Andrews (1865–1950), Canadian politician
A. J. Arkell (1898–1980), British archaeologist and colonial administrator
A. J. Ayer (1910–1989), English philosopher
A. J. Baker (1922–2017), Australian philosopher
A. J. Balaban (1889–1962), co-founder of Balaban and Katz
A. J. Barnes, American politician
A. J. Beck (1914–2006), American Air Force major general
A. J. Blackwell (1842–1903), American businessman
A. J. Bliss (1862–1931), British iris breeder
A. J. Bernheim Brush, American computer scientist
A. J. Butcher, English writer
A. J. Cook (1883–1931), British trade union leader
A. J. R. de Soysa (1869–1939), Ceylonese proprietor and politician
A. J. Delgado, American attorney, political commentator, and writer
A. J. DeMedio (1916–1997), American politician
A. J. Eddy (1880–1976), American politician
A. J. Folley (1896–1981), American judge
A. J. Gibson (1862–1927), American architect
A. J. Gillbo (1858–1919), American politician
A. J. Hackett (born 1958), New Zealand entrepreneur and bungy jumper
A.J. Han Vinck (born 1949), Dutch computer scientist and academic
A. J. Hedding (1883–1954), American politician
A. J. Holloway (1939–2018), American politician
A. J. Humbert (1821–1877), British architect
A. J. Irwin (born 1957), American federal agent
A. J. Iversen (1888–1979), Danish cabinetmaker and furniture designer
A. J. John (1893–1957), Indian freedom fighter and statesman
A. J. T. Johnsingh (born 1945), Indian ecologist
A. J. B. Johnston, Canadian historian, novelist, and museum writer
A.J. Timothy Jull (born 1951), American radiocarbon scientist
AJ Kanwar (born 1948), Indian dermatologist
AJ Kerr (1922–2010), South African scholar
A. J. Khubani (born 1959), American inventor, entrepreneur, and marketing executive
A. J. H. Latham (born 1940), British economic historian
A. J. Mackenzie (1912–1945), Scottish barrister, soldier, and author
A. J. Manikannan, Indian politician
A. J. McCosh (1858–1908), American surgeon
A. J. McNamara (1936–2014), American politician and judge
A. J. W. McNeilly (1845–1911), Irish-Canadian lawyer and politician
AJ Mediratta, American investor
A. J. Mills (1841–1925), American politician
A. J. A. Morris (born 1936), British historian
A. J. Mundella (1825–1897), British manufacturer and politician
A. J. Muste (1885–1967), Dutch-American clergyman and political activist
A. J. M. Muzammil, Sri Lankan politician
AJ Enayet Nur, Bangladeshi politician
A. J. Pardini (1932–2011), American politician
A. J. Pollard (born 1941), British medieval historian
A. J. P. Ponrajah (1927–1986), Sri Lankan civil engineer
A. J. Ranasinghe (1927–2022), Sri Lankan politician, state minister, and diplomat
A. J. Reid (c. 1909–1993), Canadian politician
A. J. Roberts (1863–1939), Australian businessman
A. J. Russell (1852–1902), American politician
A. J. R. Russell-Wood (1940–2010), Welsh historian
A. J. Sabath, American politician
A. J. Sampson (1839–1921), American diplomat, lawyer, and politician
A. J. Sefi (1889–1934), English philatelist and stamp dealer
A. J. Smitherman (1883–1961), American lawyer, journalist, and civil rights activist
A. J. Spiker, American politician
A. J. H. Stewart (1860–1917), Canadian politician
A. J. Sylvester (1889–1989), British civil servant
A. J. A. Symons (1900–1941), English writer and bibliographer
A. J. Taylor (1911–2002), English historian
A. J. Thomas Jr. (1923–2004), American politician
A. J. P. Taylor (1906–1990), British historian
A. J. Thomas (disambiguation), multiple people
A. J. Weberman (born 1945), American political activist, gadfly, and writer
A. J. Wickwar, Sri Lankan general
A. J. Witono (1925–1989), Indonesian military officer and diplomat
Jill Price (born 1965), the first diagnosed hyperthymestic, originally identified as "AJ"

Fictional characters 

 AJ Ahmed, character in the British soap opera EastEnders
 A.J. Arno, character in the American film trilogy, Dexter Riley
 AJ Chandler, character in the American drama All My Children
 A. J. Chegwidden, character in the American series JAG
 A. J. Quartermaine, character in the American soap opera General Hospital
 A. J. Raffles, character created by British writer, E. W. Hornung
 A.J. Soprano, character in the American series The Sopranos
 AJ, character in the American cartoon Blaze and the Monster Machines
 AJ, character in the American cartoon The Fairly OddParents